Nilakkottai taluk is a taluk of Dindigul district of the Indian state of Tamil Nadu. The headquarters of the taluk is the town of Nilakkottai.

Demographics
According to the 2011 census, the taluk of Nilakkottai had a population of 286,591 with 144,479  males and 142,111 females. There were 984 women for every 1000 men. The taluk had a literacy rate of 69.18. Child population in the age group below 6 was 14,387 Males and 13,498 Females.

References 

Taluks of Dindigul district